Juan Bostelmann Willerer (born February 13, 1954) is a Mexican sprint canoer who competed in the late 1970s. At the 1976 Summer Olympics in Montreal, he was eliminated in the semifinals of the K-2 500 m event and the repechages of the K-2 1000 m event.

References
Sports-reference.com profile

1954 births
Canoeists at the 1976 Summer Olympics
Living people
Mexican male canoeists
Olympic canoeists of Mexico
Mexican people of German descent